Ronald Jenkees is an American composer and musician best known for his YouTube keyboard performances. , his YouTube videos had been viewed over 84 million times and he has 400 thousand subscribers. He has released five independent albums: his eponymous first album Ronald Jenkees (2007), Disorganized Fun (2009), Days Away (2012), Alpha Numeric (2014), and Rhodes Deep (2017).

Musical career
Jenkees began releasing beats and raps online under the name "Big Cheez" in about 2003. Under this name, he produced the 2005 album Straight Laced by Fish. In 2006, Jenkees started posting funny videos on YouTube, and later began posting music-related videos. These videos usually feature him wearing a hat and greeting his viewers by saying, "Hello YouToobs!" His videos gradually gained popularity, particularly after Bill Simmons from ESPN.com featured Jenkees and asked him to record his podcast theme, and again after being "thumbed up" by members of the StumbleUpon community. In 2007, Jenkees independently released his first studio album, Ronald Jenkees. In June 2009, Jenkees was featured on the STS9 album, Peaceblaster: The New Orleans Make It Right Remixes, producing a remix of "Beyond Right Now". On July 31, 2009, Jenkees released his second album, Disorganized Fun. He subsequently released Days Away in 2012, Alpha Numeric in 2014, and Rhodes Deep in April 2017.

A selection of music from his first two albums is included in the Iridium Studios's game "Before the Echo" (previously known as "Sequence").

Style

Jenkees creates a variety of music ranging from electronic music to hip hop to rock and roll using pianos, keyboards, and various PC-controlled electronic synthesizers. He uses keyboard and synthesizer synthetic voices to add a variety of instruments into his sound. The result is a combination of rock and roll with techno or trance-influenced rock opera. In some of his YouTube videos, he plays the harmonica in his slower tempo songs. Jenkees is distinguished in his videos by the array of hats he wears, his thick glasses, and his distinctive voice. Besides playing the keyboard, he also sings.

Discography
 Solo albums

 Produced albums
 Fish: Straight Laced (as Big Cheez) (2005)
(Variations and updated versions of some songs on Straight Laced can be found on Jenkees' first album as instrumentals.)

 Appearances
 Sound Tribe Sector 9: Peaceblaster: The New Orleans Make It Right Remixes (track 29, "Beyond Right Now") (2009).
 Soundtrack for PC game Before The Echo (previously known as "Sequence") by Iridium Studios.
 Soundtrack for There Came an Echo by Iridium Studios.
 Kennedy Space Center Holidays in Space Rocket Garden Light Projection Show
 Music on hold when calling Google in North America
"Sidetracked" is used as the intro and outro music in Linux Unplugged

See also
 List of YouTube celebrities

References

External links
 
 
 Official SoundCloud Page 
 Official Bandcamp Page 

Living people
American male composers
21st-century American composers
Year of birth missing (living people)
American YouTubers
American male pianists
21st-century American pianists
21st-century American male musicians